David Sanes Rodríguez (1954 – 19 April 1999) was a native of Vieques, Puerto Rico whose death became a rallying point for those opposed to the U.S. military presence on and use of his home island for live-fire bombing practice. Sanes Rodríguez's death sparked the organization of the Cause for Vieques and a series of protests by residents and activists that culminated in the US Navy abandoning Vieques.

Biography

Sanes Rodríguez was a civilian employee of the United States Navy, working as a security guard at the Navy's Atlantic Fleet Weapons Training Facility on Vieques. Sanes Rodríguez was killed when two errant 500 lb Mk 82 bombs from a Marine F/A-18C Hornet fighter landed 100 yards from a clearly identified hilltop observation post in which Sanes Rodríguez was working. Known amongst his friends for his happy-go-lucky, partying lifestyle, in death, Sanes Rodríguez became a household name in Puerto Rico. His funeral received widespread media coverage, including U.S. newspapers and international television networks. Sanes Rodríguez had two children that he raised as his own named Jessica Cruz and Manuel Cruz.

See also
List of notable Puerto Ricans

External links
Press Release by Rep. José Serrano on the 1st Anniversary of David Sanes Rodríguez's death
Lincoln Park Camp of Young Lords in Solidarity with Vieques protesters

1954 births
1999 deaths
People from Vieques, Puerto Rico
Security guards killed in the line of duty